Beautiful You is the result of a two-year collaboration between John Illsley, the former bass player for Dire Straits, and Irish singer-songwriter Greg Pearle.

Track listing
 Secret Garden
 Shine  
 One  
 Demons  
 Loving You  
 Beautiful You  
 Love Let Me Breathe  
 Got No Plans  
 Crazy Kind of Love  
 I Believe  
 Precious

Personnel
John Illsley - bass guitar, lead guitar & lead vocals
Greg Pearle - lead vocals & acoustic guitar
Guy Fletcher - keyboards
Jamie Lane - drums
Chris White - brass & saxophone
Paul Brady - whistle & backing vocals
Danny Cummings - percussion

References

John Illsley albums
2008 albums